Lerer is a surname. Notable people with the surname include:

Kenneth Lerer, American businessman and media executive
Seth Lerer (born 1956), scholar of English and Comparative Literature 
Yechiel Lerer (1910–1943), Yiddish poet

Jewish surnames
Yiddish-language surnames